Brookwood Lye is a   nature reserve in Brookwood in Surrey. It is managed by the Surrey Wildlife Trust.

This is mainly wet grassland which has a rich variety of flora. Other habitats include alder carr and broadleaved woodland. There are many birds and invertebrates such as dragonflies.

There is no public access to the site.

References

Surrey Wildlife Trust